Soltan Ismayil oghlu Hajibeyov (also transliterated as Sultan Gadzhibekov; 5 May 1919 – 19 September 1974), was a Soviet Azerbaijani composer. He was awarded the People's Artist of the USSR (on 26 July 1973)

Biography 
Soltan Hajibeyov was born 5 May 1919 in Shusha, Russian Empire. He was Uzeyir Hajibeyov's cousin. Hajibeyov was a composer who contributed greatly to the formation of national symphonic music of Azerbaijan. He authored a ballet "Gulshen" (1950), a musical comedy "Red rose" (1940), two symphonies (1944, 1946), "Karavan" (1945) and a children's opera "Iskander and a shepherd" (1947)

Hajibeyov was the Rector of Azerbaijan State Conservatory (now Baku Academy of Music) from 1969 to 1974. He received the Stalin Prize of second degree in 1952 for his ballet "Gulshen" and was awarded the title of People's Artist of the USSR in 1973.

Hajibeyov died on 19 September 1974, in Baku, Azerbaijan SSR, Soviet Union.

See also
 List of People's Artists of the Azerbaijan SSR
 Osman Hajibeyov

References

Notes

Sources
Aida Tagizade, Sultan Gadzhibekov : zhiznʹ i tvorchestvo (Sultan Gadzhibekov: life and creative work) , Baku, 1985
El'mira Abasova, Sultan Gadzhibekov , Azerbaijan State Publishing, Baku, 1965

1919 births
1974 deaths
Musicians from Shusha
Azerbaijani composers
People's Artists of the Azerbaijan SSR
People's Artists of the USSR
Stalin Prize winners
Recipients of the Order of the Red Banner of Labour
Soviet composers
Soviet male composers
Soviet Azerbaijani people
Baku Academy of Music alumni
20th-century classical musicians
20th-century composers
20th-century male musicians
Honored Art Workers of the Azerbaijan SSR